The Wrays, also known as The Wray Brothers Band, were an American country music group from Oregon composed of Bubba Wray, Scotty Wray, Jim Covert, Lynn Phillips and Joe Dale Cleghorn. Following several independent singles, The Wrays released three singles on Mercury Records in the 1980s. Their highest-charting single, "You Lay a Lotta Love on Me," reached the Top 50 on the Billboard Hot Country Singles chart in 1987. After The Wrays broke up, lead singer Bubba Wray launched a successful solo career as Collin Raye.

Singles

ACredited to The Wray Brothers Band.

References

External Links
  as 'The Wrays'
  as 'The Wray Brothers Band'

American country music groups
Musical groups from Oregon
1983 establishments in Oregon
1987 disestablishments in Oregon
Musical groups established in 1983
Musical groups disestablished in 1987